Loudoun Heights is an unincorporated community in Loudoun County, Virginia, near Harpers Ferry, West Virginia. It is located in the Between the Hills region of the county along Harpers Ferry Road (VA 671) and is bounded to its northwest and northeast by the Harpers Ferry National Historical Park on the Potomac River. The Blue Ridge and Short Hill Mountain bound it to the west and east.

History
This high ground was occupied by Confederate general John George Walker during the Battle of Harpers Ferry, September 12-15, 1862. Loudoun Heights was also the site of a night attack made on January 10, 1864, by Col. John S. Mosby's Rangers against Major Henry A. Cole's 1st Potomac Home Brigade Maryland Volunteer Cavalry. Mosby's attack failed and ended a long run of engagements between Mosby's Rangers and Cole's cavalry.

Virginia populated places on the Potomac River
Unincorporated communities in Loudoun County, Virginia
Washington metropolitan area
Unincorporated communities in Virginia